Darovskoy District is an administrative and municipal district (raion), one of the thirty-nine in Kirov Oblast, Russia. It is located in the west of the oblast. Its administrative center is the urban locality (an urban-type settlement) of Darovskoy. Population:  14,990 (2002 Census);  The population of the administrative center accounts for 60.2% of the district's total population.

References

Notes

Sources

Districts of Kirov Oblast